Pittosporum aliferum is a species of plant in the Pittosporaceae family. It is endemic to New Caledonia.

References

Endemic flora of New Caledonia
aliferum
Endangered plants
Taxonomy articles created by Polbot